Riverside is a station on Metra's BNSF Line in Riverside, Illinois. In Metra's zone-based fare system, Riverside is in zone C. As of 2018, Riverside is the 100th busiest of Metra's 236 non-downtown stations, with an average of 493 weekday boardings. A staffed station building is on the south side of the three tracks.

The station was built about 1901 by the Chicago, Burlington and Quincy Railroad according to a design by the company's general architect, Walter Theodore Krausch.

References

External links 

Riverside Road entrance from Google Maps Street View

Riverside, Illinois
Metra stations in Illinois
Former Chicago, Burlington and Quincy Railroad stations
Railway stations in Cook County, Illinois
Railway stations in the United States opened in 1902
1902 establishments in Illinois